Rhys Palmer (born 13 February 1989) is a former professional Australian rules footballer who played for the Fremantle Football Club, Greater Western Sydney Giants and Carlton Football Club in the Australian Football League (AFL). He won the AFL Rising Star award in 2008.

Early life
Palmer was born in 1989 and played junior football for the Bullcreek Leeming Junior Football Club.

Palmer was a key member of Western Australia's victorious 2007 AFL Under 18 Championships side, averaging 32 possessions and 3 goals per game.  He finished second by one vote behind Cale Morton in the Larke Medal and was named in the Under 18 All-Australian side.

Palmer gained attention again at 2007 AFL Draft Camp finishing second in the 3 km time trial with a time of 10min 25sec and fifth in the beep test with a score of 14.8.

AFL career
Palmer was taken at pick #7 overall in the 2007 AFL Draft by Fremantle.

He put in some impressive performances in the 2008 NAB Cup and after being named as an emergency for the opening round of the 2008 season, Palmer made his debut in Round 2 at Subiaco Oval against Hawthorn. Whilst his debut match was impressive individually, with 22 possessions and a goal, Fremantle lost the match by 15 points. In his second match he was awarded the AFL Rising Star nomination for his outstanding performance in the Western Derby, despite receiving a gash to his head in the opening quarter.

After being nominated in Round 3, Palmer won the 2008 AFL Rising Star ahead of Cyril Rioli from Hawthorn with 8 of the 9 judges voting him as the best emerging player. He missed most of the 2009 season because of a knee reconstruction.

Palmer joined  in September 2011, becoming the third uncontracted player, after Phil Davis and Callan Ward, to join the club in preparation for its entry into the AFL for the 2012 season.

At the conclusion of the 2016 season, Palmer was traded to Carlton. He made his first senior appearance for Carlton at the MCG against Essendon, as a late inclusion. Carlton recorded their first win of the season, winning by 15 points. At the conclusion of the 2017 season, he was delisted by Carlton.

In 2018 he returned to Western Australia and joined Swan Districts in the West Australian Football League (WAFL).

In March 2019 he threw his shoes onto the Gloucester Park harness racing track during the feature race. No horses or reinsmen were injured, but there were calls for Palmer to be banned for life from racetracks due to the dangerous act.

On 16 March 2019, at roughly 7:30pm local time, Palmer suffered serious injuries in a motorcycle accident in Perth, resulting in Palmer being placed in an induced coma.

Palmer has since relocated to Kalgoorlie-Boulder and continues to play football with the Kalgoorlie City Football Club (Kangas). He was awarded Best on Ground in the 2021 Grand Final and later won the club’s fairest and best award for the season.

Statistics
 Statistics are correct to round 19 of 2017 season

|- style="background:#eaeaea;"
! scope="row" style="text-align:center" | 2008
|style="text-align:center;"|
| 10 || 20 || 10 || 8 || 270 || 192 || 462 || 100 || 47 || 0.5 || 0.4 || 13.5 || 9.6 || 23.1 || 5.0 || 2.4
|-
! scope="row" style="text-align:center" | 2009
|style="text-align:center;"|
| 10 || 5 || 3 || 1 || 45 || 59 || 104 || 18 || 20 || 0.6 || 0.2 || 9.0 || 11.8 || 20.8 || 3.6 || 4.0
|- style="background:#eaeaea;"
! scope="row" style="text-align:center" | 2010
|style="text-align:center;"|
| 10 || 13 || 4 || 3 || 113 || 136 || 249 || 46 || 52 || 0.3 || 0.2 || 8.7 || 10.5 || 19.2 || 3.5 || 4.0
|-
! scope="row" style="text-align:center" | 2011
|style="text-align:center;"|
| 10 || 15 || 6 || 6 || 110 || 121 || 231 || 48 || 57 || 0.4 || 0.4 || 7.3 || 8.1 || 15.4 || 3.2 || 3.8
|- style="background:#eaeaea;"
! scope="row" style="text-align:center" | 2012
|style="text-align:center;"|
| 7 || 15 || 9 || 9 || 158 || 128 || 286 || 66 || 34 || 0.6 || 0.6 || 10.5 || 8.5 || 19.1 || 4.4 || 2.3
|-
! scope="row" style="text-align:center" | 2013
|style="text-align:center;"|
| 7 || 11 || 9 || 5 || 103 || 80 || 183 || 51 || 32 || 0.8 || 0.5 || 9.4 || 7.3 || 16.6 || 4.6 || 2.9
|- style="background:#eaeaea;"
! scope="row" style="text-align:center" | 2014
|style="text-align:center;"|
| 7 || 17 || 23 || 12 || 147 || 136 || 283 || 54 || 49 || 1.4 || 0.7 || 8.6 || 8.0 || 16.6 || 3.2 || 2.9
|-
! scope="row" style="text-align:center" | 2015
|style="text-align:center;"|
| 7 || 14 || 18 || 16 || 133 || 79 || 212 || 53 || 38 || 1.3 || 1.1 || 9.5 || 5.6 || 15.1 || 3.8 || 2.7
|- style="background:#eaeaea;"
! scope="row" style="text-align:center" | 2016
|style="text-align:center;"|
| 7 || 12 || 13 || 7 || 94 || 73 || 167 || 53 || 28 || 1.1 || 0.6 || 7.8 || 6.1 || 13.9 || 4.4 || 2.3
|-
! scope="row" style="text-align:center" | 2017
|style="text-align:center;"|
| 24 || 1 || 0 || 0 || 6 || 6 || 12 || 4 || 2 || 0.0 || 0.0 || 6.0 || 6.0 || 12.0 || 4.0 || 2.0
|- class="sortbottom"
! colspan=3| Career
! 123
! 95
! 67
! 1179
! 1010
! 2189
! 493
! 359
! 0.8
! 0.5
! 9.6
! 8.2
! 17.8
! 4.0
! 2.9
|}

References

External links

1989 births
Living people
Fremantle Football Club players
East Fremantle Football Club players
AFL Rising Star winners
Australian rules footballers from Western Australia
Greater Western Sydney Giants players
Carlton Football Club players
Preston Football Club (VFA) players
Swan Districts Football Club players
Australian people of Scottish descent